Inuksuk Point (Enukso Point, Inuksugalait) is a small peninsula on Foxe Peninsula, approximately  from Kinngait (formerly Cape Dorset) on the southwest of Baffin Island in Nunavut, Canada.

This location is renowned due to a group of more than 100 inuksuit - stone cairns built by Inuit. The site has been a National Historic Site of Canada since 23 October 1969.

References

Inuit culture
National Historic Sites in Nunavut
Archaeological sites in Nunavut
Peninsulas of Baffin Island